Khabar (also Romanized as Khabr and Khebr; also known as Khebreh and Khowr) is a village in Khabar Rural District, Dehaj District, Shahr-e Babak County, Kerman Province, Iran. At the 2006 census, its population was 263, in 60 families.

References 

Populated places in Shahr-e Babak County